Charles Henry Lovell (November 12, 1854 – October 17, 1916) was a farmer, lumber merchant and political figure in Quebec. He represented Stanstead in the House of Commons of Canada from 1908 to 1916 as a Liberal.

He was born in Barnston, Canada East, the son of Henry Lovell and Artemissa Merriman, and was educated at the Coaticook Academy. Lovell went into business with his brothers Moodie Brock and Fritz Ernest. He married Ada Bush. Lovell was elected to the House of Commons in a 1908 by-election held following the death of his father. He died in office at his home in Coaticook at the age of 61.

Electoral record

References 

Members of the House of Commons of Canada from Quebec
Liberal Party of Canada MPs
1854 births
1916 deaths